This is an incomplete list of Filipino full-length films, both mainstream and independently produced, released in theaters and cinemas in 2015.

Top grossing films

The films released in 2015 by domestic gross are as follows:

1.  A Second Chance earned an estimated total of ₱ 556,000,000 which includes international gross.
2.  Crazy Beautiful You earned an estimated total of ₱ 420,000,000 which includes international gross.
3.  The Love Affair earned an estimated total of ₱ 320,000,000 which includes international gross.

Films

January–March
Color key

April–June
Color key

July–September

October–December
Color key

Awards

Local
The following first list shows the Best Picture winners at the four major film awards: FAMAS Awards, Gawad Urian Awards, Luna Awards and Star Awards; and at the three major film festivals: Metro Manila Film Festival, Cinemalaya and Cinema One Originals. The second list shows films with the most awards won from the four major film awards and a breakdown of their total number of awards per award ceremony.

International
The following list shows Filipino films (released in 2015) which were nominated or won awards at international industry-based awards and FIAPF-accredited competitive film festivals.

See also
 2015 in the Philippines

References

Philippines